Hisham Layous (born 13 November 2000) is an Israeli professional footballer who plays as a forward for Hapoel Tel Aviv.

Early life
Layous was born in Mi'ilya, Israel, to an Arab-Christian family.

Club career
Layous is a product of the different Israeli football youth sportive systems.

He signed contract with a Ukrainian side Karpaty Lviv in July 2019 and made his debut for FC Karpaty as a second half-time substituted player in a home losing game against FC Dynamo Kyiv on 31 July 2019 in the Ukrainian Premier League.

References

External links

2000 births
Living people
Arab-Israeli footballers
FC Karpaty Lviv players
Israeli Arab Christians
FC Rukh Lviv players
F.C. Kafr Qasim players
Hapoel Tel Aviv F.C. players
Ukrainian Premier League players
Liga Leumit players
Israeli expatriate footballers
Expatriate footballers in Ukraine
Israeli expatriate sportspeople in Ukraine
Footballers from Northern District (Israel)
Israel under-21 international footballers
Association football forwards
Arab citizens of Israel
Israeli footballers